In Christianity (especially in the Roman Catholic, Orthodox, Anglican and Methodist traditions), an oblate is a person who is specifically dedicated to God and to God's service.

Oblates are individuals, either laypersons or clergy, normally living in general society, who, while not professed monks or nuns, have individually affiliated themselves with a monastic community of their choice. They make a formal, private promise (annually renewable or for life, depending on the monastery with which they are affiliated) to follow the Rule of the Order in their private lives as closely as their individual circumstances and prior commitments permit. Such oblates are considered an extended part of the monastic community; for example, Benedictine oblates also often include the post-nominal letters 'OblSB' or 'ObSB' after their names on documents. They are comparable to the tertiaries associated with the various mendicant orders.

The term "oblate" is also used in the official name of some religious institutes as an indication of their sense of dedication.

Origins and history
The word oblate (from the Latin oblatus – someone who has been offered) has had various particular uses at different periods in the history of the Christian church.

The children vowed and given by their parents to the monastic life, in houses under the Rule of St. Benedict, were commonly known by this term during the century and a half after its writing, when the custom was in vogue, and the councils of the Church treated them as monks. This practice continued until the Tenth Council of Toledo in 656 forbade their acceptance before the age of ten and granted them free permission to leave the monastery, if they wished, when they reached the age of puberty. The term puer oblatus (used after that Council) labels an oblate who had not yet reached puberty and thus had a future opportunity to leave the monastery, though puer oblatus can also refer to someone entering an abbey. At a later date the term "oblate" designated such lay men or women as were pensioned off by royal and other patrons upon monasteries or benefices, where they lived as in an almshouse or homes.

In the 11th century, Abbot William of Hirschau or Hirsau (died 1091), in the old diocese of Spires, introduced two kinds of lay brethren into the monastery:

 the fratres barbati or conversi, who took vows but were not claustral or enclosed monks
 the oblati, workmen or servants who voluntarily subjected themselves, while in the service of the monastery, to religious obedience and observance.

Afterwards, the different status of the lay brother in the several orders of monks, and the ever-varying regulations concerning him introduced by the many reforms, destroyed the distinction between the conversus and the oblatus.

The Cassinese Benedictines, for instance, at first carefully differentiated between conversi, commissi and oblati; the nature of the vows and the forms of the habits were in each case specifically distinct. The conversus, the lay brother properly so called, made solemn vows like the choir monks, and wore the scapular; the commissus made simple vows, and was dressed like a monk, but without the scapular; the oblatus made a vow of obedience to the abbot, gave himself and his goods to the monastery, and wore a sober secular dress.

But in 1625, we find the conversus reduced below the status of the commissus, inasmuch as he could make only simple vows for a year at a time; he was in fact indistinguishable, except by his dress, from the oblatus of a former century. Then, in the later Middle Ages, oblatus, confrater, and donatus became interchangeable titles, given to any one who, for his generosity or special service to the monastery, received the privilege of lay membership, with a share in the prayers and good works of the brethren.

Canonically, only two distinctions ever had any consequence:

 that between those who entered religion "per modum professionis" and "per modum simplicis conversionis" the former being monachi and the latter oblati
 that between the oblate who was "mortuus mundo" ("dead to the world," that is, who had given himself and his goods to religion without reservation), and the oblate who retained some control over his person and his possessions – the former only (plene oblatus) was accounted a persona ecclesiastica, with enjoyment of ecclesiastical privileges and immunity (Benedict XIV, "De Synodo Dioce.", VI).

Modern practices

Secular oblates 
Many Benedictine communities still retain secular oblates. These are either clergy or laypeople affiliated in prayer with an individual monastery of their choice, who have made a formal private promise (annually renewable or for life) to follow the Rule of St. Benedict in their private life at home and at work as closely as their individual circumstances and prior commitments permit.

In the Roman Catholic Church the oblate is in an individual relationship with the monastic community and does not form a distinct unit within the Church, there are no regulations in the modern canon law of the Church regarding them. One consequence is that non-Catholic Christians can be received as oblates of a Catholic monastery. Similarly in Methodist monasteries, non-Methodist Christians can be received as oblates. The same is the case with many Anglican monasteries, which accept non-Anglican Christians as oblates.

Conventual oblates
There is a small number of conventual or claustral oblates, who reside in a monastic community. If the person has not done so previously, after a year's probation they make a simple commitment of their lives to the monastery, which is received by the superior in the presence of the whole community. More on the level of committed volunteers, they would share in the life of the community and undertake, without remuneration, any work or service required of them. They are not, however, considered monks or nuns themselves. Often they wear a religious habit similar to, but distinct from, that of the monks or nuns. A conventual oblate may cancel this commitment at any time; and it is canceled automatically if the superior sends the oblate away for good reason, after simple consultation with the chapter.

Religious congregations that use "oblate" in their name

There are several religious orders (i.e., living the consecrated life according to church law) that use the word "oblate" in their name, or in an extended version of their common name. These are not oblates like the oblates (secular) and (regular), and should not be confused with them.

Examples include the:
Oblates of St. Francis de Sales
Missionary Oblates of Mary Immaculate
Oblates of the Virgin Mary
Oblates of St Frances of Rome (founded 1433 in Italy, as a community of professed oblates living in common)
Oblate Sisters of Providence
Oblates of St. Joseph
Oblates of Saints Ambrose and Charles

Notable oblates

 Saint Boniface
 Bede
 St. Henry II, Holy Roman Emperor
 St. Hildegard of Bingen
 St. Frances of Rome
 Servant of God Dorothy Day
 Kathleen Norris (poet)
 Walker Percy
 Gottschalk of Orbais
 Cardinal Francis Eugene George, O.M.I.
 Saint Bishop Eugene de Mazenod, O.M.I.
 Cardinal Jean-Marie Rodrigue Villeneuve, O.M.I.
 Servant of God Romano Guardini

See also
 Third order

References

External links
Oblates of Saint Brigid of Kildare Monastery
Oblates of St. Frances of Rome
International Benedictine Oblates
Community of Jesus Oblates
The Monastery of Our Lady and Saint Laurence, Orthodox

Organisation of Catholic religious orders